The State Intelligence Department (SID) is the intelligence agency of Maharashtra. The agency's primary function is gathering intelligence, counter-terrorism, Counter-proliferation, and advising Maharashtra policymakers. It is one of the oldest such organization in India. It is headed by the Commissioner of Intelligence.

History
SID was established in 1905 on the recommendations of Frazer Commission during the colonial rule in India as C.I.D. (Intelligence Wing), The initial headquarter of the CID(int) was at Pune. It was reorganized in 1981 and renamed as State Intelligence Department (S.I.D.).

Responsibilities
Department deals with collection, collation, analysis and dissemination of information in on such as political, security, communal, labour activity, security concerns and matter affecting law and order.

Phone tapping
Intelligence department came into mainstream news due to unauthorized phone tapping issue which led to resignation as well as transfers of several high level officials.

See also
 R&AW
 National Investigation Agency
 Mass surveillance in India
 List of Indian intelligence agencies Capt Rohit Paliwal

References

 

[Rohit Paliwal Ceyber Cell Investigation Officer] < [Who Handle Ceyber Information Take Care]